Josef Çınar (born 22 January 1984) is a German former professional footballer, who played as a defender, and the manager of Eintracht Trier.

Playing career
In January 2017, Çınar returned to his former club Eintracht Trier signing a -year contract.

Managerial career
In October 2018, Çınar ended his playing career and took over Eintracht Trier as a caretaker manager. He was later officially confirmed as the permanent manager of the club.

References

External links

Profile at FuPa.net

1984 births
Living people
Association football defenders
German footballers
SC Verl players
SV Eintracht Trier 05 players
SV Wacker Burghausen players
Chemnitzer FC players
Gaziantep F.K. footballers
3. Liga players
Regionalliga players
Footballers from Bremen